Granite Lake is a lake in Barron County, Wisconsin, in the United States. Granite Lake is a 155 acre lake located in Barron County. It has a maximum depth of 34 feet.

History
Granite Lake was named for the granite rock found in the vicinity.

See also
List of lakes in Wisconsin

References

Lakes of Barron County, Wisconsin